Women in Korea may refer to:
 History of women in Korea
 Women in the Joseon Dynasty
 Women in North Korea
 Women in South Korea